Jan Navrátil (born 13 April 1990) is a Czech footballer who plays for 1. FC Slovácko as a midfielder.

Honours 
SK Sigma Olomouc
 Czech Cup: 2011–12
 Czech Supercup: 2012

References

External links
 
 Guardian Football 
 

1990 births
Living people
Czech footballers
Czech Republic youth international footballers
Czech Republic under-21 international footballers
Czech First League players
SK Sigma Olomouc players
FC Slovan Liberec players
1. FC Slovácko players
Association football midfielders
Sportspeople from Olomouc